Oxathres implicata is a species of beetle in the family Cerambycidae. It was described by Melzer in 1926.

References

Acanthocinini
Beetles described in 1926